Samuel Gorley Putt  (9 June 1913 – 24 April 1995), was a British academic, author and stood as a Liberal Party candidate, but failed to win a seat, at the 1945 General Election. He actively discouraged people from using his first name, Samuel, and was known as simply Gorley Putt.

Early life and education
He was the son of Poole Putt and Ellen Blake Gorley of Brixham, Devon. His father was killed in 1918 during the First World War when his ship was torpedoed. He was educated at Torquay Grammar School and in 1930 won a scholarship to Christ's College, Cambridge where he received a First Class Honours in both parts of the English tripos in 1933. In 1934, with assistance from the Commonwealth Fund Fellowship he attended Yale University where he obtained his first MA. Putt's View from Atlantis released in 1955 recollected his experiences in America.

Professional career
In 1936 Putt became an assistant in the BBC Talks Department, resigning after around a year in 1938. He worked as a freelance literary reviewer, spent a year lecturing in English at the University College of the South West in Exeter, and then briefly served as warden of a hostel and secretary of the appointments committee at Queen's University of Belfast (1939–40).

During the Second World War, he entered the Royal Navy and in 1940 was serving on a destroyer protecting convoys; in 1941 he became a Naval Intelligence officer and served at Bletchley Park, rising to the rank of Lieutenant-Commander by 1946. After the war, he went back to University College, Exeter, as the warden of Crossmead Hall, tutor to overseas students as well as the director of the International Summer School (1946–49). He became warden of Harkness House in London in 1949, remaining there until 1968. While there he also directed the Commonwealth Fund's international fellowship division (1966–68). For this work he was awarded the OBE (1966) and later received the Cavaliere, Order of Merit of Italy (1980).

In 1968 he became a Fellow, of Christ's College, Cambridge; Senior Tutor from 1968–78 and Praelector from 1976–80. During this period, he held visiting professorships at the University of Massachusetts (1968), University of the South, Sewanee (1976), University of Pisa (1979) and Texas Christian University (1985).

Writings
Putt described his experiences at sea in the Second World War in Men Dressed as Seamen (1943). He wrote about his experiences at Yale in View from Atlantis (1955). His autobiography was entitled Wings of a Man's Life.

He wrote two books on the author Henry James.

Political career
He was Liberal candidate for his home constituency, the Torquay Division of Devon at the 1945 General Election.

He did not stand for parliament again.
In 1966 he was awarded the OBE.

Publications
Author
Men Dressed As Seamen (1943), illustrated by Roger K. Furse
View from Atlantis (1955)
Coastline (1959)
Scholars of the Heart (1962) 
A Reader's Guide to Henry James (1966)
The Golden Age of English Drama (1981)
A Preface to Henry James (1986)
Wings of a Man’s Life (1990) 
Arthur Mizener (1991)
Editor
Essays and Studies (1963)
Cousins and Strangers (1956)

References

1913 births
1995 deaths
Liberal Party (UK) parliamentary candidates
Alumni of Christ's College, Cambridge
Fellows of the Royal Society of Literature
People from Brixham
People from Oakington